St. Jakobus is a Catholic church and a former parish in Rüdesheim am Rhein, Hesse, Germany. It dates back to the 10th century, was expanded around 1400, and again in 1913/14. The church was severely damaged by bombing in World War II, and rebuilt from 1947 to 1956. It is a listed historic monument and serves also as a concert venue.

History 
The oldest parts of the building from the 10th century are found in the basement of the northern tower. An early-Romanesque chapel dates back to the 11th century.

It was first an aisleless church, dedicated to James, son of Zebedee. In 1489, it was expanded by a northern nave and vaulted. Baroque changes were a new helmet for the steeple from 1766 and a high altar. The building was expanded further in 1913/24 to the east and south. The church burnt down by bombing on 25 November 1944. The only surviving features are the western facade, the northern nave and the tower. The church was rebuilt, in modified form and again with a flat ceiling, from 1947 to 1956. The foundation of the rebuilding was laid on 25 July 1947, the feast day of the patron saint that year. It was celebrated in 2017 with services, an exhibition, and concerts.

The parish was merged as to a larger parish on 1 January 2015. It is now part (Kirchort) of the parish Heilig Kreuz Rheingau, with the central church in Geisenheim.

The church is also a venue for concerts of sacred music, including a venue of the Rheingau Musik Festival which held a concert of chamber music with organ in 2017.

Organ 

The organ was built in 1964 by the company Wagenbach from Limburg, first with 40 stops on three manuals and pedal. It was renovated and expanded in 1996 to 44 stops by Oberlinger (Windesheim).  In 2014, another stop was added, Contraposaune (contra trombone), a low stop rare in the state of Hesse, making the organ the largest organ in the Rheingau, used for the liturgy and for concerts.

Literature 
 Reclams Kunstführer Deutschland III, Denkmäler, Rheinlande und Westfalen, 1975, 
 Werner Schäfke: Der Rhein von Mainz bis Köln, Dumont Reiseverlag, Ostfildern, 4. Auflage 2006, S. 297f,

References

External links 
 

14th-century Roman Catholic church buildings in Germany
Roman Catholic churches in Hesse
Rebuilt churches in Germany
Buildings and structures in Rheingau-Taunus-Kreis